DaVon Hamilton (born February 1, 1997) is an American football nose tackle for the Jacksonville Jaguars of the National Football League (NFL). He played college football at Ohio State.

Early years
Hamilton attended Pickerington High School Central in Pickerington, Ohio. He originally committed to the University of Kentucky to play college football but switched to Ohio State University.

College career
Hamilton played at Ohio State from 2015 to 2019. After redshirting his first year, he played in 54 games over the next four. He finished his career with 66 tackles and seven sacks.

Professional career

Hamilton was drafted by the Jacksonville Jaguars in the third round (73rd overall) of the 2020 NFL Draft. He was placed on the reserve/COVID-19 list by the Jaguars on July 27, 2020, and was activated six days later.

In Week 10 against the Green Bay Packers, Hamilton recorded his first career sack on Aaron Rodgers during the 24–20 loss. On December 5, 2020, Hamilton was placed on injured reserve.

References

External links
Ohio State Buckeyes bio

1997 births
Living people
People from Pickerington, Ohio
Players of American football from Ohio
American football defensive tackles
Ohio State Buckeyes football players
Jacksonville Jaguars players